Caspary and Caspari are surnames. People with those names include:
 Alfred H. Caspary (18771955), American philatelist
 Anita Caspary (19152011), American nun who renounced her vows and founded a lay women's association
 Carl Paul Caspari (181492), Norwegian neo-Lutheran theologian and academic
 Daniel Caspary (born 1976), German politician 
 David Caspari (16481702), German Lutheran theologian
 Ernst Caspari (19091988), German-American geneticist
 Georg Caspari (16831743), Baltic German academic, son of David Caspari
 Leopold Caspari (18301915), French-born American businessman and politician in Louisiana
 Robert Caspary (181887), German botanist
 Casparian strip, a feature of plant anatomy named after Robert Caspary
 Theodor Caspari (18531948), Norwegian poet, novelist, travel writer, literary critic and teacher
 Vera Caspary (18991987), American writer of novels, plays, screenplays and short stories
 Walter Caspari (18771962), German military officer, policeman, and leader of a Freikorps paramilitary unit
 Freikorps Caspari, a Freikorps unit named after Walter Caspari

See also 
 Caspari Aquilae (AKA Caspar Aquila, 14881560), German theologian and reformer
 Eleutherodactylus casparii, a species of frog known as Casparii
 Johannes Gijsbertus de Casparis (19162002), Dutch orientalist and indologist
 Casper (disambiguation)
 Gaspar (disambiguation)
 Kasper (disambiguation)
 
 

Surnames from given names